Andrau Airpark  was a public use airport located in the Alief community of Houston, Texas, United States, formerly an unincorporated section of Harris County, from the late 1940s through 1998. The airport was southeast of the intersection of Old Westheimer Road (since renamed West Houston Center Boulevard) and Richmond Avenue. The airport closed in 1998 and as of 2008 is the Royal Oaks Country Club subdivision.

Airport History

The first known photo of the area is from 1953. The  tract of land that included the airport, which was one of the oldest private airfields in Greater Houston, was owned by descendants of the Andrau family.

The airport served general aviation for west Houston, but a Douglas DC-3 and an A-26C Invader are known to have landed there. The airport had two runways, the longest at 4,750 feet, and a seaplane landing and takeoff pond on the east end of the airpark.

Bee Line, a small commuter air carrier based in the Houston area, operated scheduled passenger flights on the weekends with small twin prop aircraft during the mid-1970s between the airport and Lakeway Airpark near Lake Travis in central Texas.

The airport was closed on December 23, 1998, when a Houston real estate firm paid Andrau Airpark Inc., the airport's owners, 53 million dollars for the land. The tract went under contract to the Camden Property Trust. The airport was quickly demolished and the Royal Oaks Country Club subdivision and a golf course replaced the field.

References

External links

 
  Abandoned & Little-Known Airfields: Western Houston

Defunct airports in Texas
Airports in Houston
Airports disestablished in 1998